Helena Rosendahl Bach also simply known as Helena Bach (born 12 June 2000) is a Danish freestyle swimmer. She represented Denmark at the 2020 Summer Olympics which also marked her debut appearance at the Olympics. During the 2020 Summer Olympics, she competed in the women's 1500m freestyle and in the women's 200 metre butterfly Incidentally, the women's 1500m freestyle event also made its Olympic debut during the Tokyo Olympics.

References 

2000 births
Living people
Danish female swimmers
Danish female freestyle swimmers
Place of birth missing (living people)
Swimmers at the 2020 Summer Olympics
Olympic swimmers of Denmark
European Games competitors for Denmark
Swimmers at the 2015 European Games
21st-century Danish women
European Aquatics Championships medalists in swimming